The Skimm (styled theSkimm) is an American media company, founded in 2012 by Danielle Weisberg and Carly Zakin, providing a subscription-only newsletter. The newsletter is a digest of news stories intended to be simple and easy to read. The company has come under fire recently for its treatment of its employees, particularly pregnant women, who were the first to be eliminated during the latest round of layoffs. As of 2023, the company is financially uneasy as it has reduced its workforce by over 20% over the last four months.

History

theSkimm was started in 2012, when founders Weisberg and Zakin left their jobs as producers at NBC.

In June 2016, theSkimm raised $8 million in Series B funding to move into video with the launch of Skimm Studios. The round was led by 21st Century Fox and included early backers RRE Ventures, Homebrew and Greycroft Partners.

In the fall of 2016, theSkimm interviewed 12 of the major candidates for U.S. President and registered 110,000 people to vote in the 2016 election.

On March 15, 2018, theSkimm raised a $12 million funding round led by Google Ventures, along with Spanx founder Sara Blakely. 

In October 2018, theSkimm announced that they have over 7 million subscribers.

In April 2019, theSkimm acquired texting platform Purple.

In November of 2020, the first large round of layoffs were carried out, wherein theSkimm eliminated over 20% of their workforce due to poor staff planning. After committing to no additional layoffs, an additional 10% of the workforce was eliminated in November of 2022 due to a "poor financial outlook." This round of layoffs was followed by another unannounced mass layoff in January of 2023, where an additional 10% of the staff was immediately let go. TheSkimm has come under  fire for its treatment of its employees. During these rounds of layoffs, several pregnant employees and employees on maternity leave were let go without notice or severance.

Products and Services 
The Daily Skimm is the company's daily email newsletter. It focuses on a short, simple, and easy-to-read version of the news, and is marketed to urban women aged 22–34. As of November 2016, the newsletter has over 4 million subscribers.

In 2016, theSkimm launched the Skimm Ahead app for iOS, which directly inserts events into its subscribers' calendars.

On March 4, 2019, theSkimm launched its first daily news podcast, Skimm This. Available weekday evenings at 5 p.m. ET, the podcast breaks down the news of the day and explains the context and clarity of each story and why it's important. It's the second podcast launched by theSkimm after previously launching Skimm'd from the Couch in 2018. In 2021, theSkimm launched the career podcast 9 to 5ish.

Recent initiatives include '#ShowUsYourLeave', was launched to encourage congress to prioritize paid family leave policies. The campaign advocates for more transparency around paid family leave programs and more support of working women and families of all kinds.

See also 
List of daily news podcasts

References

Electronic mailing lists
American companies established in 2012
News agencies based in the United States
Newsletter publishing companies
Podcasting companies
News podcasts